The Hon. Captain Herbert Tongue Allsopp (5 December 1855 – 31 January 1920) was an English first-class cricketer who played for Cambridge University.

Allsopp was the son of the brewer Henry Allsopp, 1st Baron Hindlip. He was educated at Cheltenham College, and Trinity Hall, Cambridge. He played five matches for Cambridge University in 1876, including the Varsity match which Cambridge won.  His highest score of 22 came when playing for Cambridge University in the match against Gentlemen of England.
His best bowling of 3/15 came when playing for Cambridge University in the match against Marylebone Cricket Club. 
He played for Marylebone Cricket Club (MCC) in 1877 and for Worcestershire County Cricket Club against MCC in 1880, but the matches were not given First Class status.

Allsopp joined the 10th Royal Hussars as a 2nd Lieutenant in 1877 and served with them in the Second Anglo-Afghan War, 1878–80. He was present at the attack and capture of Ali Musjed and took part in the engagement at Futtehabad. He was promoted to lieutenant in 1881 and took part in the Nile Expedition of 1884. He was present at the engagements at El Teb and Temai and was promoted to captain in 1887. He retired from the army in  1890 and was playing cricket for I Zingari.

Allsop died at Walton Bury, Staffordshire at the age of 64. His brother Frederic Allsopp and his brother-in-law George Buckston also played First Class cricket.

References

1855 births
1920 deaths
People educated at Cheltenham College
Alumni of Trinity Hall, Cambridge
English cricketers
Cambridge University cricketers
10th Royal Hussars officers
Sportspeople from Gloucestershire
Younger sons of barons